Diamond Lake is an unincorporated community in Pend Oreille County, Washington, United States located southwest of Newport, Washington. The Diamond Lake community is built around Diamond Lake.

Lake

Diamond Lake is a  natural lake located in the area north of U.S. Route 2.

Diamond Lake offers year-round fishing and has a population of Largemouth Bass, Yellow Perch, bullheads, Rainbow and Brown trout. A cooperative net pen project releases 12,500 Rainbow Trout, Rainbows and Browns. Approximately 200 Rainbow Trout surplus broodstock are farmed in Diamond Lake annually.

References

Unincorporated communities in Pend Oreille County, Washington
Unincorporated communities in Washington (state)
Lakes of Washington (state)
Bodies of water of Pend Oreille County, Washington